The brown kukri snake (Oligodon purpurascens) is a species of snake of the family Colubridae.

Geographic range
The snake is found in Asia.

References 

Reptiles described in 1837
Snakes of Asia
Colubrids
Oligodon